Sillavengo is a comune (municipality) in the Province of Novara in the Italian region of Piedmont, located about  northeast of Turin and about  northwest of Novara.

Sillavengo borders the following municipalities: Arborio, Briona, Carpignano Sesia, Castellazzo Novarese, Ghislarengo, Landiona, and Mandello Vitta.

References

Cities and towns in Piedmont